Prem Kumar Selvam (born 10 January 1994) is a Malaysian karateka. He won the gold medal in the men's kumite 55 kg event at the 2019 Southeast Asian Games held in the Philippines. Two years earlier, he won bronze in this event. He is also a bronze medalist at the Asian Games and a two-time bronze medalist at the Asian Karate Championships.

Career 

In 2018, he won one of the bronze medals in the men's kumite 60kg event at the Asian Games held in Jakarta, Indonesia.

He also won one of the bronze medals in the men's kumite 55kg event at the 2018 Asian Karate Championships held in Amman, Jordan. At the 2019 Asian Karate Championships held in Tashkent, Uzbekistan, he won one of the bronze medals in the men's kumite 55kg event.

In 2021, he competed at the World Olympic Qualification Tournament held in Paris, France hoping to qualify for the 2020 Summer Olympics in Tokyo, Japan.

He won one of the bronze medals in the men's kumite 55kg event at the 2022 Asian Karate Championships held in Tashkent, Uzbekistan.

Achievements

References

External links 
 

Living people
1994 births
Place of birth missing (living people)
Malaysian male karateka
Malaysian people of Indian descent
Malaysian Hindus
Karateka at the 2018 Asian Games
Medalists at the 2018 Asian Games
Asian Games medalists in karate
Asian Games bronze medalists for Malaysia
Southeast Asian Games gold medalists for Malaysia
Southeast Asian Games bronze medalists for Malaysia
Southeast Asian Games medalists in karate
Competitors at the 2017 Southeast Asian Games
Competitors at the 2019 Southeast Asian Games
Competitors at the 2021 Southeast Asian Games
21st-century Malaysian people